The Treaty of Weissenburg ( or Weißenburger Vertrag) declared Archduke Ferdinand of Austria the ruler of Royal Hungary and Transylvania. It was signed in Weissenburg (Gyulafehérvár) on 19 July 1551. The territory had previously been ruled by John Zápolya's widow, Isabella Jagiełło.

See also
List of treaties

Further reading 

1551 in the Habsburg monarchy
Archduchy of Austria
Weissenburg
Weissenburg
1551 treaties
16th century in Hungary
Eastern Hungarian Kingdom
Ferdinand I, Holy Roman Emperor